Kadavul is a 1997 Indian Tamil language film directed by Velu Prabhakaran. The film stars Velu Prabhakaran, Manivannan, Arun Pandiyan, Mansoor Ali Khan and Roja. It was released on 5 December 1997. Despite having controversial themes, the film was well received.

Plot 

Parvathi (Roja), a young woman, is a goddess believer while her father (V. Gopalakrishnan) is the priest of a temple. After a quarrel between two castes during a Hindu festival, the temple was closed off. Five years later, the temple reopens.

Muthu (Rahul) and Thenmozhi (Nandhini) are in love but they are not of the same caste. Velusamy (Karikalan), Thenmozhi's uncle, finds out their love and forces her to marry him.

K. Shanmugam (Mansoor Ali Khan), a corrupt MLA, kills a girl and blames Thamizharasan (Arun Pandian). Thamizharasan fights against injustice and is a revolutionary. Angry, Thamizharasan tries to kill him but fails and eventually steals his money. In the process, Thamizharasan is injured and the prostitute Shenbagam (Rupasri) takes care of him.

Rajapandi (Velu Prabhakaran), an atheist, propagates the non-existence of God. One day, he saves Parvathi from her uncle K. Shanmugam and accidentally marries her. Soon, Rajapandi gets beaten by the devotees. In anger, Rajapandi challenges God to become a human and understand the humans, and God (Manivannan) appears as a human.

Cast 

Velu Prabhakaran as Rajapandi
Manivannan as God
Arun Pandian as Thamizharasan
Mansoor Ali Khan as K. Shanmugam M.L.A
Roja as Parvathi
Rahul as Muthu
Nandhini as Thenmozhi
V. Gopalakrishnan as Parvathi's father
Karikalan as Velusamy
Naga Kannan
Roopa Sri as Shenbagam
J. Lalitha as Thenmozhi's mother
Shakeela
Vincent Roy
Suryakanth
Meesai Murugesan as Naidu
V. Pandu

Production 
Sathyaraj had been first choice to play the lead role, but his refusal prompted Velu Prabhakaran to take on the lead role himself. Delhi-based model and former air hostess Nandhini was signed on to play a role after the director had seen her modelling pictures.

Soundtrack 
The music was composed by Ilaiyaraaja, with lyrics written by Pulamaipithan.

Reception 
Yugandhan of Kalki wrote though Kadavul speaks about atheism, its not a complete effort. He also added approaching the theme superficially, by adding a bit of crudeness, can be more dangerous than blue films. He praised Ilaiyaraaja's background score as the only highlight of the film.

Sequel 
In January 2018, Prabhakaran announced that he would be making a sequel, titled Kadavul 2. The film has RR Tami Selvan, Swathy as the lead pair with Imman Annachi and veteran Seetha essaying supporting roles.

References

External links 

1990s Tamil-language films
1997 films
Antitheism
Fiction about God
Films critical of religion
Films directed by Velu Prabhakaran
Films scored by Ilaiyaraaja